The 2018 UCI BMX World Championships was the 23rd edition of the UCI BMX World Championships and took place at the BMX VeloPark in Baku, Azerbaijan from 5 to 9 June 2018.

Just as at the 2017 edition, four medal events were held.

Medal summary

Elite events

Junior events

Medal table

References

External links

UCI BMX World Championships
UCI BMX World Championships
International sports competitions hosted by Azerbaijan
UCI BMX World Championships
UCI BMX World Championships